Victor Anciaux (24 December 1931 – 24 February 2023) was a Belgian doctor and politician. A member of the People's Union, he served in the Chamber of Representatives from 1965 to 1995.

Anciaux died on 24 February 2023, at the age of 91.

References

1931 births
2023 deaths
20th-century Belgian politicians
People's Union (Belgium) politicians
Members of the Chamber of Representatives (Belgium)
Members of the Flemish Parliament
KU Leuven alumni
People from Boechout